Davenport v. Dows, 85 U.S. (18 Wall.) 626 (1873), is a US corporate law case concerning the derivative suits in Delaware.

Facts

Judgment
Justice Davis said the following.

See also

United States corporate law

References

External links
 

United States Supreme Court cases
United States Supreme Court cases of the Chase Court
United States corporate case law
1873 in United States case law